Andersoniodoxa is a small genus of flowering plants in the family Malpighiaceae, native to Costa Rica, Colombia, and northern Brazil. Amolecular and morphological study showed that its species, formerly included in Lophanthera, were more closely related to Spachea, requiring a new genus to be erected.

Species
The following species are accepted:
Andersoniodoxa hammelii 
Andersoniodoxa marcelae 
Andersoniodoxa spruceana

References

Malpighiaceae
Malpighiaceae genera
Flora of Costa Rica
Flora of Colombia
Flora of North Brazil